The 2020 Calgary National Bank Challenger was a professional tennis tournament played on indoor hard courts. It was the second edition of the tournament and part of the 2020 ATP Challenger Tour. It took place in Calgary, Canada.

Singles entrants

Seeds

1 Rankings are as of 17 February 2020.

Other entrants 
The following players received wildcards into the singles main draw:
  Taha Baadi
  Gabriel Diallo
  Alexis Galarneau
  Cleeve Harper
  Joshua Peck

The following player received entry into the singles main draw using a protected ranking:
  Blake Mott

The following players received entry from the qualifying draw:
  Felix Corwin
  Alex Rybakov

The following players received entry as lucky losers:
  Harri Heliövaara
  Dennis Novikov

Champions

Singles

  Arthur Rinderknech def.  Maxime Cressy 3–6, 7–6(7–5), 6–4.

Doubles

  Nathan Pasha /  Max Schnur def.  Harry Bourchier /  Filip Peliwo 7–6(7–4), 6–3.

References

Calgary National Bank Challenger
2020
2020 in Canadian tennis
February 2020 sports events in Canada
March 2020 sports events in Canada